Norberto Oliosi (Bracciano, 1 December 1945) is a former Italian sprinter.

Biography
He won one medal with the national relay team at the International athletics competitions. He has 9 caps in national team from 1971 to 1974. In 1997 he became Cavalier of the Order of Merit of the Italian Republic.

Achievements

National titles
In the "Pietro Mennea era", Norberto Oliosi has won just one time the individual national championship.
1 win in 100 metres (1971)

See also
Italy national relay team

References

External links
 
 Norberto Oliosi at The Sports

1945 births
Living people
People from Bracciano
Italian male sprinters
European Athletics Championships medalists
Italian Athletics Championships winners
Sportspeople from the Metropolitan City of Rome Capital